Brigg and Goole is a constituency in Yorkshire and Lincolnshire represented in the House of Commons of the UK Parliament since 2010 by Andrew Percy, a Conservative.

The constituency is among a small minority of constituencies that span two ceremonial counties, in this case Lincolnshire and the East Riding of Yorkshire.

The industrial port of Goole is the biggest settlement in the constituency. There are over 70 towns and villages in the constituency, including the Lodge Moor and Skippingdale areas of Scunthorpe. The constituency also includes part of the Scunthorpe Steel Works and the Scunthorpe United football ground, as well as the Isle of Axholme.

The constituency is split across North Lincolnshire and the East Riding of Yorkshire and borders South Yorkshire, North Yorkshire Nottinghamshire and Lincolnshire.

History
Brigg and Goole constituency was created for the 1997 general election from parts of the seats of Boothferry, Glanford & Scunthorpe and Brigg & Cleethorpes.

In the 2007 local elections the Conservatives won 12 of the Council seats in the constituency compared to 6 for Labour, 2 for the Liberal Democrats and 1 Independent.

In 2010 Andrew Percy won the Brigg and Goole constituency for the first time at the 2010 general election, ending 13 years of representation by the Labour Party. The Liberal Democrats amassed their largest share of the vote since the seat's creation in 1997.

In the 2011 local elections the Conservatives made further progress, winning 3 seats from Labour and one from the Independents. The Conservatives now have 15 councillors, compared to 5 for Labour (2 gains from the Liberal Dems) and one Independent. The Conservatives also increased their share of vote compared to 2007.

In the 2015 general election, the Conservatives received their highest vote ever in the constituency, with Labour receiving their lowest number of votes. Following the council elections held on the same day, the Conservatives now have 16 Councillors in this constituency, 14 on North Lincs Council and 2 on the East Riding of Yorkshire Council. Labour have a record low 4 Councillors and there is 1 Independent.

At the 2017 general election, the Conservatives again recorded a swing towards them from Labour, against both the regional and national swings.

In the 2019 local Council elections Labour lost all of their Council seats in the constituency with the Conservatives gaining 3 Council seats. Currently there are 19 Conservative Councillors in the constituency (15 sitting on North Lincs Council and 4 sitting on the East Riding of Yorkshire Council) and 2 Independent Councillors. Incumbent MP Andrew Percy got re-elected with 71.3% of the vote, making it one of the safer Conservative seats in all of Britain in spite of having been held by Labour merely ten years before.

Boundaries

The Borough of North Lincolnshire wards of Axholme Central, Axholme North, Axholme South, Brigg and Wolds, Broughton and Appleby, Burringham and Gunness, and Burton upon Stather and Winterton, and the District of East Riding of Yorkshire wards of Goole North, Goole South, and Snaith, Airmyn, Rawcliffe and Marshland.

Members of Parliament

Elections

Elections in the 2010s

Elections in the 2000s

Elections in the 1990s

See also 
 List of parliamentary constituencies in Humberside

Notes

References

External links 
nomis Constituency Profile for Brigg and Goole — presenting data from the ONS annual population survey and other official statistics.

Parliamentary constituencies in Lincolnshire
Parliamentary constituencies in Yorkshire and the Humber
Borough of North Lincolnshire
Constituencies of the Parliament of the United Kingdom established in 1997
Brigg